Frank "Frankie" Fleming (1893-1960) was a Canadian featherweight boxer active from 1910 to 1922. During his career he held the distinction of being the Canadian Boxing Federation Featherweight Champion. He is best known for beating all-time great Benny Leonard twice, being the only fighter to do so. He also faced Hall of Famers Johnny Kilbane, Johnny Dundee, and Freddie Welsh in defeat; challenging for the latter's World Featherweight Title. Statistical boxing website BoxRec rates Fleming as the 11th best Canadian boxer ever across all weight divisions.

Notable bouts

References

External links

1893 births
1960 deaths
Boxers from Toronto
Featherweight boxers
Canadian male boxers